Hissanol were a two-piece experimental indie rock band based in both Amsterdam, the Netherlands and Victoria, British Columbia, Canada active between 1994 and 1998.  The band was a studio-only project from former NoMeansNo guitarist Andy Kerr and Scott Henderson of Shovlhed, Swell Prod., the Showbusiness Giants, and other groups.

Since its two members lived on separate continents, the band collaborated via air mail, building upon each other's songs on multi-track recording equipment.  Each member played a number of instruments and sang.  The group released two full-length albums on Alternative Tentacles.

Both musicians remain active; Kerr is currently playing in Two Pin Din.

Discography
4th and Back CD/LP (1995, Alternative Tentacles)
The Making of Him CD/LP (1998, Alternative Tentacles)

External links
Hissanol at Alternative Tentacles
Alternative Tentacles web page

Canadian experimental musical groups
Musical groups from Amsterdam
Musical groups from Victoria, British Columbia
Musical groups established in 1994
Musical groups disestablished in 1998
Alternative Tentacles artists
1994 establishments in British Columbia
1998 disestablishments in British Columbia
1994 establishments in the Netherlands
1998 disestablishments in the Netherlands